The men's ISSF 25 meter rapid fire pistol was a shooting sports event held as part of the Shooting at the 1952 Summer Olympics programme. It was the ninth appearance of the event. The competition was held on 27 and 28 July 1952 at the shooting ranges in Helsinki with 53 shooters from 28 nations competing. The maximum number of shooters per nation was reduced to 2, from 3 in previous Games. The event was won by Károly Takács of Hungary, the first man to successfully defend an Olympic rapid fire title (and second to win multiple medals of any color). Hungary also took the second place, with Szilárd Kun earning silver. Gheorghe Lichiardopol of Romania won bronze in his nation's debut in the event.

Background

This was the ninth appearance of what had been standardised in 1948 as the men's ISSF 25 meter rapid fire pistol event, the only event on the 2020 programme that traces back to 1896. The event has been held at every Summer Olympics except 1904 and 1928 (when no shooting events were held) and 1908; it was nominally open to women from 1968 to 1980, although very few women participated these years. There is no women's equivalent on the Olympic programme, as of 2021. The first five events were quite different, with some level of consistency finally beginning with the 1932 event—which, though it had differences from the 1924 competition, was roughly similar. The 1936 competition followed the 1932 one quite closely. The post-World War II event substantially altered the competition once again.

Four of the top 10 shooters from 1948 returned: gold medalist Károly Takács of Hungary, silver medalist Carlos Enrique Díaz Sáenz Valiente of Argentina, fourth-place finisher (and 1936 bronze medalist Torsten Ullman of Sweden, and ninth-place finisher Michelangelo Borriello of Italy. The two-time reigning (1949 and 1952) world champion was Huelet Benner of the United States; Penait Calcai of Romania had been the runner-up in 1952 and Valiente (the 1947 world champion) had placed third.

Bulgaria, Canada, Guatemala, Puerto Rico, Romania, the Soviet Union, and Venezuela each made their debut in the event. The United States made its seventh appearance in the event, most of any nation.

Competition format

The competition format followed the 1948 format, now very close to the modern rapid fire pistol competition after significant variation before World War II. Each shooter fired 60 shots. These were done in two courses of 30; each course consisted of two stages of 15; each stage consisted of three series of 5. In each stage, the time limit for each series was 8 seconds for the first, 6 seconds for the second, and 4 seconds for the third. 

A holdover from the previous Games was that full-body silhouettes, rather than round targets, continued to be used; however, scoring rings had been added so that now each shot was scored up to 10 rather than being strictly hit or miss. Hits were the primary measurement of success; points were only used to differentiate between shooters with the same number of hits.

Records

Prior to the competition, the existing world and Olympic records were as follows.

No new world or Olympic records were set during the competition.

Schedule

Results

A shoot-off was held between Kun and Lichiardopol for the silver and bronze medals; both tied at 142 in the first shoot-off round of 15 shots. In the second shoot-off round, Kun won 140 to 137.

References

Shooting at the 1952 Summer Olympics
Men's 1952